Find Me may refer to:

Literature
 Find Me (novel), by André Aciman, 2019
 Find Me, a 2002 memoir by Rosie O'Donnell
 Find Me, a 2015 novel by Laura van den Berg
 Find Me, a 2017 novel by Jon Stock

Music

Albums
 Find Me (Happy Rhodes album), 2007
 Find Me (Christina Grimmie EP), 2011

Songs
 "Find Me" (Marshmello song), 2016
 "Find Me" (Sigma song), featuring Birdy, 2016
 "Find Me", by Alison Moyet from the 1991 album Hoodoo
 "Find Me", by Allday from the 2014 album Startup Cult
 "Find Me", by Alma from the 2020 album Have U Seen Her?
 "Find Me", by David Gates from the 2002 album The David Gates Songbook
 "Find Me", by Kings of Leon from the 2016 album Walls
 "Find Me", by Laura Branigan from the 1983 album Branigan 2
 "Find Me", by Muroki, 2022
 "Find Me", by Robin Schulz from the 2015 album Sugar
 "Find Me", by Tinie Tempah from the 2017 album Youth

Other uses
 "Find Me" (The Walking Dead), 2021 episode of the series
 Find Me, a 2018 film featuring Kirby Howell-Baptiste
 Find Me, a 2017–18 television series, app, and game produced by BlackBoxTV
 MapQuest Find Me, a MapQuest locator service for GPS-enabled mobile phones

See also
 
 
 Find me/follow me, two services for routing incoming phone calls